Acrolepia tharsalea is a moth of the  family Acrolepiidae. It was described by Walsingham in 1914. It is found in Guatemala.

References

Moths described in 1914
Acrolepiidae